NATA may refer to:

 National Association of Testing Authorities, Australia, a not-for-profit accreditation authority for analytical laboratories in Australia.
 National Air Transportation Association, a public policy group representing general aviation interests in the United States.